Xcacau Corona is a corona (geological formation in the form of crown) in the planet Venus, in the coordinates -56 ° S and 131 ° E.

It covers a circular surface about 200 kilometers in diameter. It is located in Henie Quadrangle.

The Xcacau Corona was named in 1997 in reference to the Xcacau, the K'iche' goddess of the cacao and fertility.

See also
Corona (planetary geology)

References

External links
 USGS Planetary Names – Lada Terra Altimetric map to a 1 / 10000000 of the quadrangle Lada Terra (USGS I-2523)
 USGS Planetary Names – Aphrodite Terra Altimetric map to 1 / 10000000 of the quadrangle Aphrodite Terra (USGS I-2476)
 NASA site related to the exploration of Venus
 Xcacau Corona about Gazetteer of Planetary Nomenclature

Surface features of Venus